Rose Stone Star is a 2020 Italian drama film directed by Marcello Sannino. It stars Ivana Lotito, Ludovica Nasti, Fabrizio Rongione and Imma Piro. The film premiered in the Voices section of the 2020 International Film Festival Rotterdam.

Cast
 Ivana Lotito as Carmela
 Ludovica Nasti as Carmela's daughter
 Fabrizio Rongione as Tarek
 Imma Piro as Carmela's mother
 Valentina Curatoli
 Francesca Bergamo
 Anna Redi
 Gigi Savoia
 Pietro Juliano
 David Power

Production
In February 2019, it was announced documentary filmmaker Marcello Sannino will direct his first feature and production will take around five weeks in Portici and Naples. Parallelo 41, Bronx Film and PFA Films will produce in collaboration with RAI Cinema. The film received a contribution from the Region of Campania and is supported by the Regione Campania Film Commission in collaboration with the Municipality of Portici.

References

External links
 

2020 films
2020 drama films
Italian drama films
2020s Italian-language films